A vaccinator is a person who gives injections of a vaccine to people. Vaccinators require the skills of knowing where to inject the needle into the recipient as well as preparing the substance to be injected.

Under normal conditions, routine inoculations can be given by one’s healthcare provider, at a pharmacy, or at special clinics set up in a community. But when a mass vaccination effort is being undertaken, such as during a pandemic, people of various qualifying occupations may be sought specifically for the role as vaccinators due to high demand. Some of them may work full time at the job; others could do so part time in addition to their regular occupation. Some retirees may also work part-time.

Training

Training to be a vaccinator does not only require the skills to give an injection. Training is also needed in the storage and preparation of the materials used to give the shots of varying brands, which have differing requirements. Anaphylaxis training is a part of vaccinator training in some places.

Qualifying occupations
The following are some of the occupations that qualify a person to work as a vaccinator, which vary by location:
 Dentist
 Medical assistant
 Medical student
 National guard
 Nurse
 Nursing student 
 Paramedic
 Pharmacist
 Physician
 Physician assistant
 Veterinarian
 Veterinary assistant

See also
 Vaccination
 Vaccine
 List of vaccine topics

References

Health care occupations
Vaccination